The Parintintin are an indigenous people who live in Brazil in the Madeira River basin.  They refer to themselves as Cabahyba, Kagwahiva’nga, or Kagwahiva, which means "our people."

As of 2010, the Parintintin have a population of around 418 and live in three villages on two indigenous territories (TIs): 
TI Ipixuna , and
TI Nove de Janeiro .

Language and culture
The Parintintin language is a dialect of the Tenharim language, which belongs to the Tupi-Guarani language family. It is written in the Latin script.

Parintintin people are argicultalists, fishermen, and gatherers. Their social structure is based on two moieties that are exogamous and named for different types of birds. They are a patrilineal society.

History
Following contact with Brazilians in 1946, a population of 4,000 at the time was eventually reduced to 120 after Brazil's second rubber boom and the construction of the Trans-Amazon highway in 1970.  Further colonization of the Amazon basin led to the spread of diseases that the Parintintin were not prepared for.

Current issues
The Parintintin currently face possible downstream impacts from the Madeira Hydroelectric Complex.

See also
List of indigenous peoples in Brazil

Notes

External links
 Instituto Socioambiental (Portuguese)
 Parintintin (Portuguese)
 Flickr set of TI Nove de Janeiro
 International Rivers 

Indigenous peoples in Brazil
Indigenous peoples of the Amazon